The 2013–14 season is ŠK Slovan Bratislava's 94th season in its existence and 8th consecutive season in Corgoň liga, top flight of Slovak football.

Competitions

Overview

Corgoň Liga

League table

Results summary

Results by round

Matches

Kickoff times are in CET.

Notes

Slovnaft Cup
Round of 32

Round of 16

Quarterfinals

ŠK Slovan Bratislava won 5–1 on aggregate.

Semifinals

UEFA Champions League

Second qualifying round

Friendly matches

Players

Squad, appearances and goals
Source:

Transfers
Source: Wikipedia

In:

Out:

Awards
This the list of awards awarded to ŠK Slovan Bratislava players during the season.

ŠK Slovan Bratislava Player of the Month

Source:

References

ŠK Slovan Bratislava seasons
SK Slovan Bratislava season